Send Them to Coventry is the debut mixtape by British rapper Pa Salieu. It was self-released on 13 November 2020 under exclusive licence to Warner Music UK. Production was handled by Aod, Felix Joseph, Kwes Darko, Jevon, Sillkey, Chucks, Honeywood6, The Fanatix, Wauve and Yussef Dayes. It features guest appearances from BackRoad Gee, Boy Boy, Eight9FLY, Lz Dinero, M1llionz, Mahalia, Ni Santora, Stizee and Shakavellie.

Critical reception 

Send Them to Coventry was met with universal acclaim from music critics. At Metacritic, which assigns a normalized rating out of 100 to reviews from mainstream publications, the mixtape received an average score of 90 based on eight reviews.

Robert Kazandjian of Clash praised the work, saying: "stunning debut mixtape 'Send Them to Coventry'. The 15-track project is a musical kaleidoscope, fusing elements of afro-swing, dancehall, grime, and rap. Sonically, it speaks to the fluidity of Black sounds". Will Pritchard of Pitchfork said: "this is an extraordinarily assured first offering from a young artist capable of surprising at every turn. The result is not so much a foreboding portrait of a forgotten, boom-and-bust city, but an invitation to a place and people unduly ignored—and an introduction to an artist who won't be". Bella Martin of DIY said: "imbued throughout with a fusion of Pa's Gambian heritage, and life growing up in Coventry ("COV, #cityofviolence" introduces "Informa"), it's a varied, confident and cinematic trip through where the performer finds himself". Dhruva Balram of NME said: "seriously brilliant stuff. Send Them to Coventry promises that Salieu is unbelievably gifted with a ceiling nowhere in sight. He carries the entire mixtape with his singular voice oscillating between conventional rap flows, dancehall toasts and ice-cold venomous lyrics". Alexis Petridis of The Guardian found out that the mixtape "sounds like it would have been successful at any time, regardless of extraneous circumstances: it's too fresh and inventive to ignore". Damien Morris of The Observer resumed: "'Frontline' and 'My Family' are among the best singles of the year, and there are three more just as good here".

Accolades

Track listing

Charts

References 

2020 debut albums
2020 mixtape albums
Hip hop albums by British artists